Daniel P. Miranker is a Full Professor in the Department of Computer Sciences at the University of Texas at Austin. His father is Willard L. Miranker.

He co-founded Capsenta with Juan Sequeda in 2015, which stemmed from their research project, Ultrawrap. Capsenta was acquired by data.world in June 2019.

His academic interests  are in bioinformatics and the Semantic Web

Education
Miranker earned an undergraduate degree in Mathematics from MIT in 1979 and a PhD in Computer Science from Columbia University in 1987, under the supervision of Salvatore Stolfo.

References

Living people
Columbia University alumni
Massachusetts Institute of Technology School of Science alumni
University of Texas at Austin faculty
Semantic Web people
Year of birth missing (living people)